Gerald Francis O'Keefe (March 30, 1918 – April 12, 2000) was a 20th-century bishop of the Catholic Church in the United States. He served as auxiliary bishop for the Archdiocese of Saint Paul in the state of Minnesota from 1961 to 1966 and bishop of the Diocese of Davenport in the state of Iowa from 1966 to 1993.

Biography

Early life and ministry
Gerald O’Keefe was born in Saint Paul, Minnesota, to Francis and Lucille (McDonald) O’Keefe. He had a younger sister, Mary, and grew up in suburban Wayzata, Minnesota. His father worked as a railroad signalman. O'Keefe was educated in the city's public schools. He graduated from the College of Saint Thomas and studied for the priesthood at St. Paul Seminary in St. Paul, Minnesota. He was ordained a priest for the Archdiocese of St. Paul on January 29, 1944, by Archbishop John Gregory Murray. O'Keefe was assigned to the Cathedral of St. Paul and served briefly as a teacher at St. Thomas Military Academy in St. Paul, after which he served the archdiocese as vice chancellor and then chancellor. He also served as chaplain to a convent of Benedictine nuns. On June 14, 1957, Pope Pius XII named O'Keefe a Domestic Prelate with the title Monsignor.

On May 5, 1961, Pope John XXIII appointed O'Keefe Titular Bishop of Candyba and Auxiliary Bishop of St. Paul. He was consecrated by Archbishop William O. Brady on July 2, 1961, in the Cathedral of St. Paul. Bishops James Byrne of Boise and Hillary Hacker of Bismarck were the principal co-consecrators. He was named rector of the cathedral church and in 1962 vicar general of the archdiocese. While he was one of the auxiliary bishops of St. Paul, Bishop O'Keefe participated in all four sessions of the Second Vatican Council.

Bishop of Davenport
On October 20, 1966, Bishop O'Keefe was appointed by Pope Paul VI as the sixth bishop of the Diocese of Davenport. He was installed on January 4, 1967, by Archbishop James J. Byrne of Dubuque at Davenport’s Sacred Heart Cathedral. In attendance was the largest gathering of Catholic hierarchy in the cathedral's history: four archbishops, one abbot and 41 bishops. There were also 24 Protestant clergy, 300 priests, 200 sisters and two lay people from every parish in the diocese. For the first time in 22 years women were allowed to sing in the choir at the cathedral, after having been banned by Bishop Hayes.

Period of reform and renewal
During his 26 years of service in Davenport, O’Keefe put into place the reforms and spirit of the Second Vatican Council. The Priests’ Senate had been established just prior to his appointment to the diocese. A Sister's Council, representing the members of religious orders of women in the diocese, was established in 1967 as was the Lay Council. In March 1970 O’Keefe established the first Diocesan Pastoral Council, which included members of the clergy, religious orders, and the laity. A Diocesan Board of Education was also established early in his episcopate. Procedures for due process, recommended by the Canon Law Society of America, were put in place in the late 1960s. In 1978 he established the diaconate in the diocese as its own ministry, and not just "transitional" for those pursuing the priesthood. The first class of deacons was ordained December 13, 1980. A Deacons Council, similar to those for the priests, sisters and laity, was also organized.

St. Vincent’s Home, which had taken care of orphaned and abandoned children since 1897, was discontinued in 1968. The following year Catholic Charities was replaced with the Office of Social Action under the leadership of the Rev. Marvin Mottet. In 1974 O’Keefe established the Diocesan Pastoral Center and residence for both retired and active priests in the former St. Vincent's Home. Offices of Religious Education and Family Life were also established.

Ministry to Latinos became a priority in the diocese. As early as the post-World War I era, Spanish-speaking people came into the diocese in noticeable numbers. Their numbers ebbed during the Great Depression and World War II. In the 1950s migrant workers entered the diocese to work the farm fields around Muscatine and their numbers started to increase slowly after that. Bishop O’Keefe joined with Bishops Arthur O'Neil of Rockford and John Franz of Peoria to create an office that assisted migrant workers with job and education services. In 1972 the Social Action department established an Immigration Office. Priests were also sent to Mexico to learn Spanish and to be immersed in the culture. Three Spanish-speaking deacons were ordained in 1981.

Bishop O’Keefe called two diocesan synods into existence, the fourth and fifth for the diocese. The 1974 synod was the first since 1932 and included vowed religious and the laity for the first time. The synod focused on spiritual renewal, unifying and restructuring the diocese. The 1985 synod also focused on restructuring the diocese based on the recent reforms to the Code of Canon Law.

The diocese celebrated its centennial in 1981. Sr. Madeleine Marie Schmidt, CHM, wrote a diocesan history, and a liturgy was celebrated at Sacred Heart Cathedral. In attendance was Cardinal John Cody of Chicago. A choir of voices from throughout the diocese was formed to provide the music.

Changing demographics

Throughout his years as the bishop of the diocese, O'Keefe saw a decline in the number of priests and religious serving the diocese. At the same time, he saw the numbers of lay people active in ministry increase. The population of the diocese, however, remained stable. The economic recession that hit rural America in the 1980s did have an effect on the diocesan population and resources. In 1991 he announced a plan for clustering and closing smaller parishes, which reflected both the decline in the number of priests and the rural population in Iowa. The diocese also witnessed a decline in enrollment in Catholic Schools, which led to the merger or closing of schools across Southeast Iowa. Catholic hospitals were also affected. In 1970 there were ten hospitals in the diocese and by the time O'Keefe left office they were reduced to three.

St. Ambrose and Marycrest Colleges worked on a merger in the early 1970s, but in the end, they decided against it. Both schools had become co-educational in the late 1960s. St. Ambrose hired its first lay president, Dr. William Bakrow, in 1973, and started its first Master’s Degree program in Business Administration in 1979. The school continued to grow and became a university in 1987. Marycrest started to decline. In 1990 it began an affiliation with the Teikyo Yamanashi Education and Welfare Foundation of Japan as a way to stay open and viable. It was renamed Teikyo Marycrest University and later Marycrest International University.

Ottumwa Heights College, like Marycrest, was operated by the Congregation of the Humility of Mary. It merged with Indian Hills Community College in 1979. The Sisters of Humility, who had been headquartered in Ottumwa since the 1880s, built a new headquarters and convent on the property of St. Vincent Center in Davenport in 1983.

Later life and death

In February 1992 Bishop O’Keefe was sued by two women in Minnesota for having sexually abused them when he was rector of St. Paul Cathedral in the early 1960s. Both women were young girls at the time and credited recovering repressed memories for their accusations. O'Keefe denied the charges. A year later he was cleared of any wrongdoing after it was determined the women suffered from mental illnesses and made up the stories while in therapy.

On November 12, 1993, Pope John Paul II accepted Bishop O’Keefe's resignation and he was named Bishop Emeritus of Davenport. He retired to an apartment that was created for him on the grounds of St. Vincent Center. He died of a heart attack on April 12, 2000, after having celebrated the Chrism Mass with the clergy and people of the diocese. He was buried during Holy Week in the Bishop's Circle in Mt. Calvary Cemetery in Davenport.

The library at St. Ambrose University in Davenport was named in O'Keefe's honor. However, at the request of a victim of sexual abuse who was a 17 year old novice monk with the diocesan brothers group "Franciscan Brothers of Christ the King", Rev.Mark J Powell, M.DIV. which was unrelated to the St. Paul incident, O'Keefe's name was removed by university maintenance personnel in August 2007. <reference name Powell, Catholic Messenger August 9, 2007 edition> "O'Keefe acknowledged before his death that he was told of some instances of abuse and chose to relocate the accused priests, rather than report the abuse to authorities or take action to have the priests defrocked." When bishops were making decisions about abusers during O'Keefe's lifetime, abuse was described by some psychiatrists as a curable disease.  However, the Board of Directors stated this was not an excuse to do what was morally acceptable and removed the name from the library per Rev. Mark J  Powell, M.Div's request. This request was approved by the President of St. Ambrose University and the Bishop of the Diocese of Davenport in 2007.

References

External links

1918 births
2000 deaths
Roman Catholic Archdiocese of Saint Paul and Minneapolis
Roman Catholic bishops of Davenport
Participants in the Second Vatican Council
Clergy from Saint Paul, Minnesota
People from Wayzata, Minnesota
University of St. Thomas (Minnesota) alumni
Saint Paul Seminary School of Divinity alumni
20th-century Roman Catholic bishops in the United States
American Roman Catholic clergy of Irish descent
Religious leaders from Minnesota
Catholics from Minnesota